Ciol or CIOL may refer to:
Chartered Institute of Linguists (CIOL)
Elio Ciol (born 1929), Italian photographer and publisher
Marcia Ciol, Brazilian-American statistician
Rita Ciol (or Sior), main character of anime series Sisters of Wellber